Energia Areena is a multifunctional indoor arena in the Myyrmäki Sports Park, located in the Myyrmäki district of Vantaa, Finland. The arena gets its name from its largest sponsor, the energy company Vantaan Energia.

Events
The venue is able to be modified to accommodate corporate, cultural, and concert events, among others, but is best known for its athletic uses. Energia Areena is equipped to host floorball, badminton, volleyball, basketball, handball and futsal practices and games, in addition to gymnastics and cheerleading competitions.

Energia Areena has served as home to the Finnish men's and women's national basketball teams since 2007. It is also home to the EräViikingit men's floorball team, which plays in the F-liiga. The venue also hosted the 2021 Sudirman Cup.

See also
List of indoor arenas in Finland
List of indoor arenas in Nordic countries
Myyrmäki Football Stadium

References 
Content in this article is translated from the existing Finnish Wikipedia article at :fi:Vantaan Energia -areena; see its history for attribution.

External links

 Official website (in Finnish)

Indoor arenas in Finland
Sports venues in Finland
Buildings and structures in Vantaa
Basketball venues in Finland
Badminton venues
Badminton in Finland